The Song about the towel-cloth also known as "My dear mother" is a popular Ukrainian song based on a poem by Andriy Malyshko as the remembering confession of a lyrical hero where his mother is giving him a rushnyk, an embroidered cloth usually draped over religious icons and ritual foods and also used for handfasting at weddings) as a sign of a life path.

It was set to music by composer Platon Maiboroda (a native of the Poltava Region) for the soundtrack of the 1958 Soviet film Young Years where it was performed by Oleksandr Taranets. The song was later popularized by Dmytro Hnatyuk, who is most often associated with this song. It has since been sung by such singers as Kvitka Cisyk, Yaroslav Evdokimov, Aleksandr Malinin, Alla Pugacheva, Igor Krutoy, Syabry, and Renata Babak.

The song is translated in number of languages and is popular within Ukraine as well as the Ukrainian diaspora. It is dedicated to the Motherly Love.

English lyrics
by Stepan Pasicznyk (United Kingdom)

References

External links
 .
 .
 .
 .
 
 Kharkiv spring'2022

Ukrainian songs
1958 songs
Compositions by Platon Maiboroda
Songs based on poems